Still Me Still Now is Amy Diamond's second studio album. It was released on 24 May 2006 by Bonnier Amigo Music Group.

Track listing
"Big Guns"
"Don't Cry Your Heart Out"
"My Name is Love"
"That's Life"
"All the Money In the World"
"Don't Lose Any Sleep Over You"
"Diamonds"
"Life's What You Make It"
"No Regrets"
"It Can Only Get Better"

Charts

Weekly charts

Year-end charts

References

2006 albums
Amy Deasismont albums